Alfie Atkins is a fictional character created by the author Gunilla Bergström from Sweden in 1972.
Alfie Atkins appears in books and animated cartoons. Alfie plays the role of a normal child, living with his father. During his younger years he had an imaginary friend named Malcolm (Mållgan in Swedish; Moggie in English TV version), that only Alfie could see. Later, he gets real friends such as Milla and Victor (Viktor). He also has a housecat named Puzzle (Pussel).

In the books, Alfie experiences many ordinary everyday events that kids can easily recognize. In his longing to grow up and be a big boy, Alfie often competes with his father on who can manage these events in the best way.
Alfie's father is a nice and positive man. Women appear less frequently in the stories: Alfie has an aunt named Fifi (Fiffi) and a grandmother, but no mother is present.

The first book about Alfie, Goodnight, Alfie Atkins (Godnatt, Alfons Åberg), came out in 1972. There are 24 books in the Alfie series, along with seven other Alfie books for smaller children. The books have been translated into 29 different languages. The books are written and illustrated by Gunilla Bergström.

Alfie Atkins is named Alfons Åberg in Swedish and Danish, Willi Wiberg in German, Albert Åberg in Norwegian, Albert Albertson in Polish, Einar Áskell in Icelandic, Mikko Mallikas in Finnish, Ifan Bifan in Welsh, Eliyahu in Hebrew and Frančkov Fonzek in Slovenian. Since September 2020, he also exists in France where his name is Alphonse Aubert.

The publishing company of the books is Rabén & Sjögren and Julia MacRae Books.

The last book was published in 2012, nine years before Gunilla Bergström died at the age of 79.

Books
 Good Night, Alfie Atkins ("God natt, Alfons Åberg") - 1972
 Very Tricky, Alfie Atkins ("Aja baja, Alfons Åberg") - 1973
 Raska på, Alfons Åberg - 1975
 Alfie and His Secret Friend ("Alfons och hemlige Mållgan") - 1976
 Who'll Save Alfie Atkins? ("Vem räddar Alfons Åberg?") - 1976
 You're a Sly One, Alfie Atkins! ("Listigt, Alfons Åberg") - 1977
 Is that a Monster, Alfie Atkins? ("Alfons och odjuret") - 1978
 Är du feg, Alfons Åberg? - 1981
 Var är bus-Alfons? - 1982
 Who's Scaring Alfie Atkins? ("Vem spökar, Alfons Åberg?") - 1983
 Lycklige Alfons Åberg - 1984 (also known as "Klaga lagom, Alfons Åberg!")
 You Have a Girlfriend, Alfie Atkins ("Alfons och Milla") - 1985
 Kalas, Alfons Åberg! - 1986
 Hokus pokus, Alfons Åberg! - 1987
 Bara knyt, Alfons! - 1988
 Vad sa pappa Åberg? - 1989
 Där går Tjuv-Alfons! - 1991
 Mera monster, Alfons! - 1992
 Hurra för pappa Åberg! - 1993
 Näpp! sa Alfons Åberg - 1994
 Flyg! sa Alfons Åberg - 1997
 Osynligt med Alfons - 1998
 Hur långt når Alfons? - 2002
 Alfons och soldatpappan - 2006
 Alfons med styrkesäcken - 2010
 Skratta lagom! sa pappa Åberg - 2012

Film 
Starting in the late 1970s, a cartoon series was produced, containing adaptations of the books. The main director was Per Åhlin and the musical score was composed by Georg Riedel. The show was a co-production between Åhlin's company PennFilm, the Swedish Film Institute and the Nordic television channels SVT, NRK, DR and YLE. Between 1979 and 1982, thirteen episodes of approximately 10 minutes each were produced. In 1994, three additional shorts were produced.

Animated feature and subsequent cartoon series (2010s)
In 2013, Norwegian director Torill Kove brought Alfie Atkins to cinemas with the feature presentation Hocus Pocus Alfie Atkins. It is based on the book of the same title with additions made for the sake of runtime The film was followed by a new Alfie Atkins TV series of 13 episodes.

References

External links
 Official Website
 Hocus Pocus, Alfie Atkins on IMDB

Sweden in fiction
 
Book series introduced in 1972
Literary characters introduced in 1972
Male characters in literature
Child characters in literature
Fictional Swedish people
Male characters in animation
1979 Swedish television series debuts
Swedish children's television series
Swedish animated television series